Pseudotocinclus parahybae is a species of armored catfish endemic to Brazil, where it is known only from the type locality, a tributary of the ribeirão Grande, rio Paraíba do Sul basin. It is a medium-size creek, 0.5–1.5 metres (1.6–4.9 ft) deep and 5.0 m (16.4 ft) wide at approximately 800 m (2600 ft) above sea level, on the slope of Serra da Mantiqueira, with very clear, well oxygenated, and fast flowing water, running mainly on stone beds.

References
 

Otothyrinae
Fish of South America
Fish of Brazil
Endemic fauna of Brazil
Taxa named by Adriana Kazue Takako
Taxa named by Claudio Oliveira (scientist)
Taxa named by Osvaldo Takeshi Oyakawa
Fish described in 2005